Xinzhuang is a town located in Minhang District, Shanghai, China. The town was, by the early 21st century, essentially walking toward the greater Shanghai urban area. On April 15, 1999, Korean Air Cargo Flight 6316 crashed in Xinzhuang, killing all three people on board along with five more people on the ground.

Transport
The Xinzhuang Metro Station is located in the east of Xinzhuang, providing access to Metro Line 1 and Line 5, and will provide access to Jinshan Railway in the near future. To the north and south of the station are 2 squares. In the northern square there was a bus terminal providing services to the local Xinzhuang areas (Now is under re-construction because of the Project Tianhui); at the southern square there is a bus terminal connects Xinzhuang with a number of surrounding regional areas.

Religion
A Three-Self Patriotic Movement Protestant Church is located in the south of Xinzhuang.

References

External links
Official website

Towns in Shanghai
Minhang District